Olenecamptus timorensis is a species of beetle in the family Cerambycidae. It was described by Franz in 1972.

References

Dorcaschematini
Beetles described in 1972